Vicente Delfin (born February 4, 1948 in Capiz, Philippines) is a Filipino politician.

He served as a Barangay captain of Tincupon, Panitan, Capiz and as an ABC President of Panitan in the 1990s until the 2000s before he was elected as a Municipal Councilor of the town since 2010.

References

1948 births
21st-century Filipino politicians
Living people
Politicians from Capiz